is a town located in Gunma Prefecture, Japan. , the town had an estimated population of 36,367 in 15685 households, and a population density of 1440 persons per km².

Geography
Tamamura is located in southern Gunma prefecture in the northern extremity of the Kantō plains, bordering Saitama Prefecture to the south. The Tama River flows through the town.

Rivers: Tone River, Karasu River

Surrounding municipalities
Gunma Prefecture
 Takasaki
 Maebashi
 Fujioka
 Isesaki
Saitama Prefecture
 Honjō
 Kamisato

Climate
Kanra has a Humid continental climate (Köppen Cfa) characterized by hot summers and cold winters.  The average annual temperature in Kanra is 14.5 °C. The average annual rainfall is 1250 mm with September as the wettest month. The temperatures are highest on average in August, at around 26.5 °C, and lowest in January, at around 3.4 °C.

Demographics
Per Japanese census data, the population of Tamamura has recently plateaued after several decades of strong growth.

History
Tamamura developed during the Edo period as a post town on the Nikkō Reiheishi Kaidō, a subroute to Nikkō Kaidō which connects the Nakasendō with Nikkō, bypassing Edo.

Tamamura town was created within Nawa District, Gunma Prefecture on April 1, 1889 with the creation of the modern municipalities system after the Meiji Restoration. Nawa District and Sai District merged to form Sawa District in 1896. On April 10, 1955 Tamamura annexed the neighboring village of Shibane, followed by Jōyō on August 1, 1957.

Government
Tamamura has a mayor-council form of government with a directly elected mayor and a unicameral town council of 13 members. Tamamura contributes one member to the Gunma Prefectural Assembly. In terms of national politics, the town is part of Gunma 2nd district of the lower house of the Diet of Japan.

Economy
Many people were employed in sericulture in the past.
 Agriculture - 877 people (5.1%)
 Manufacturing - 6957 people (40.2%)
 Service - 9490 people (54.8%)

Education
Kanra has five public elementary schools and two public middle schools operated by the town government and one public high school operated by the Gunma Prefectural Board of Education. The town also has one private elementary school.

 Universities
 Gunma Prefectural Women's University

Transportation

Railway
Tamamura does not have any passenger railway service. The nearest station is Shinmachi Station in the neighboring city of Takasaki.

Highway
  – Takasaki-Tamamura Smart IC

References

External links

Official Website 

Towns in Gunma Prefecture
Tamamura, Gunma